Shooty Skies is an arcade shooting game created by Hipster Whale and Mighty Games for iOS, Android, Windows, macOS, and Linux. It was released on iOS  on September 30, 2015, and on Android on November 6, 2015; it was later released on Windows, macOS, and Linux on March 6, 2018.

It is an endless arcade shoot 'em up game that involves shooting all enemies coming up from the screen, including broken TVs, robots and arcade machines. It takes numerous elements from classic arcade games including Galaga, Space Invaders, 1942, Xevious and Raiden. The player can play as one of 33 characters which can be unlocked through a random draw (bought for 500 coins) or an in-app purchase of $0.99.

Another version, titled: "Shooty Skies Overdrive" was announced in June 23, 2020 in the official Shooty Skies website, this version lets the player to shoot all enemies on a retro world in virtual reality, it was released and available on Oculus and Steam.

References

2015 video games
Android (operating system) games
iOS games
Mobile games
Windows games
MacOS games
Linux games